Matej Trusa (born 29 November 2000) is a Slovak professional footballer who currently plays for Hradec Králové, on loan from FC Viktoria Plzeň as a forward.

Club career

MFK Zemplín Michalovce
Trusa made his Fortuna Liga debut for Zemplín Michalovce against iClinic Sereď on 16 February 2019. He replaced Peter Kolesár in the stoppage time of the 1:0 home victory.

On 14 September 2019, he was seriously injured in a home league fixture against AS Trenčín, when he was tackled by Cole Kpekawa in the 8th minute of the match. He suffered tibia and fibula fracture and it was reported that he was going to be unavailable for up to 12 months. Trusa, however, managed to recover in 6 months.

International career
Trusa was first recognised in a senior national team nomination on 23 May 2022, while still being active in the U21 team although he remained unnominated for June international fixtures following a suspension ahead of a qualifier against Malta. Senior team Štefan Tarkovič recognised him as an alternate ahead of four UEFA Nations League fixtures against Belarus, Azerbaijan and Kazakhstan scheduled for June.

References

External links
 MFK Zemplín Michalovce official club profile 
 
 
 Futbalnet profile 

2000 births
Living people
People from Michalovce
Sportspeople from the Košice Region
Slovak footballers
Slovakia under-21 international footballers
Association football midfielders
MFK Zemplín Michalovce players
FC Viktoria Plzeň players
Slovak Super Liga players
Slovak expatriate sportspeople in the Czech Republic
Slovak expatriate footballers
Expatriate footballers in the Czech Republic
FC Hradec Králové players